Adi Adilović (born 20 February 1983) is a Bosnian retired goalkeeper and current goalkeeping coach at Bosnian Premier League club Sarajevo.

Career statistics

Club

Honours

Player
Željezničar 
Bosnian Cup: 2002–03 

Interblock 
Slovenian Cup: 2007–08

External links

1983 births
Living people
Sportspeople from Zenica
Association football goalkeepers
Bosnia and Herzegovina footballers
FK Željezničar Sarajevo players
NK Koprivnica players
NK Hrvatski Dragovoljac players
NK Travnik players
FK Sloboda Tuzla players
NK IB 1975 Ljubljana players
NK Ivančna Gorica players
FK Olimpik players
FK Sarajevo players
Panthrakikos F.C. players
NK Čelik Zenica players
Premier League of Bosnia and Herzegovina players
First Football League (Croatia) players
Slovenian PrvaLiga players
Super League Greece players
Bosnia and Herzegovina expatriate footballers
Expatriate footballers in Croatia
Bosnia and Herzegovina expatriate sportspeople in Croatia
Expatriate footballers in Slovenia
Bosnia and Herzegovina expatriate sportspeople in Slovenia
Expatriate footballers in Greece
Bosnia and Herzegovina expatriate sportspeople in Greece